Conus ngocngai is a species of sea snail, a marine gastropod mollusk in the family Conidae, the cone snails, cone shells or cones.

These snails are predatory and venomous. They are capable of "stinging" humans.

Description
The length of the shell attains 83 mm.

Distribution
This marine species of cone snail is endemic to Vietnam.

References

 Thach N.N. (2017). New shells of Southeast Asia. Sea shells & Land snails. 48HrBooks Company. 128 pp. page(s): 27, figs 261-263

ngocngai
Gastropods described in 2017